Vânătarea lui Buteanu, at , is the eighth-highest peak in Romania and the fifth-highest peak from Făgăraș Mountains, after Moldoveanu, Negoiu, Viștea Mare and Lespezi.
It is one of the easiest mountains to climb in Romania that is more than 2500 metres tall.
It can be reached in 2 hours from the Bâlea lake which is accessible by car in the summer and cable car in the winter.

Image gallery

See also
List of mountains in Romania

External links
 Pictures and images from the Fagaras Mountains

Mountains of Romania
Mountains of the Southern Carpathians

fr:Negoiu